Enzo Perin (born 10 August 1933) is an Italian skier. He competed at the 1956 Winter Olympics, the 1960 Winter Olympics and the 1964 Winter Olympics.

References

External links
 

1933 births
Living people
Italian male ski jumpers
Italian male Nordic combined skiers
Olympic ski jumpers of Italy
Olympic Nordic combined skiers of Italy
Ski jumpers at the 1956 Winter Olympics
Ski jumpers at the 1960 Winter Olympics
Nordic combined skiers at the 1956 Winter Olympics
Nordic combined skiers at the 1960 Winter Olympics
Nordic combined skiers at the 1964 Winter Olympics
People from Brenner
Sportspeople from Südtirol